Ron Farmer was involved in the building of the Mission Raceway Park, a racetrack in Mission, British Columbia, Canada. He was the manager of the raceway until 1995. He was inducted into the Canadian Motorsport Hall of Fame in 1998.

References

External links

Living people
Year of birth missing (living people)
Canadian motorsport people
Place of birth missing (living people)